The 2022–23 Kategoria Superiore is the 84th official season, or 85th season of top-tier football in Albania (including three unofficial championships during World War II) and the 23rd season under the name Kategoria Superiore. The season began on 19 August 2022 and will end on 24 May 2023.

The winners of this season's Kategoria Superiore will earn a place in the first qualifying round of the 2023–24 Champions League, with the second and third placed clubs earning a place in the first qualifying round of the 2023–24 Europa Conference League.

Teams 
Two clubs have earned promotion from the Kategoria e Parë, Bylis (promoted after a one-year absence) and Erzeni (promoted after a nineteen-year absence). Dinamo Tirana (relegated after only one year in the top flight) and Skënderbeu (relegated after thirteen years in the top flight) were relegated to Kategoria e Parë at the conclusion of last season.

Locations

Stadiums

Personnel and kits 

Note: Flags indicate national team as has been defined under FIFA eligibility rules. Players and Managers may hold more than one non-FIFA nationality.

Managerial changes

League table

Results 
Clubs will play each other four times for a total of 36 matches each.

First half of season

Second half of season

Positions by round 
The table lists the positions of teams after each week of matches.

Season statistics

Scoring

Top scorers

Hat-tricks 

Notes
(H) – Home team(A) – Away team

Awards

Monthly awards

See also 
 Kategoria Superiore

Notes and references

Notes

References

External links 
 
Kategoria Superiore at uefa.com

2022-23
Albania
1